Magone Lake is a  body of water in the Malheur National Forest of eastern Oregon in the United States. It receives water from Lake Creek, which continues downstream from the lake and flows into East Fork Beech Creek in the John Day River watershed.

Among the few natural lakes in this part of Oregon, Magone Lake is popular for its recreational opportunities, particularly fishing, including ice fishing during the cold months. Rainbow trout and brook trout are abundant.

The United States Forest Service maintains a campground with single-family and group sites at the lake. A separate day-use area has picnic tables, changing rooms for swimmers, and a boat dock. Wildflower viewing, hiking, and mountain biking are other activities available nearby.

See also
 List of lakes in Oregon

References

External links

Lakes of Oregon
Lakes of Grant County, Oregon
Malheur National Forest